Yangling Agricultural Hi-tech Industries Demonstration Zone is a demonstration zone located in Yangling District, Xianyang, Shaanxi, People's Republic of China. It is under the direct governance of Shaanxi Province, and is the only such zone within all of the People's Republic of China. It was created on 29 July 1997.

The Northwest A&F University, a member of 985 project club, is in the zone.

External links

Yangling District